Snow White is the fifth studio album by Australian rock band, Magic Dirt. It was released in September 2005 and peaked at number 24 on the ARIA Charts. The album saw the return of some of the bands noisier elements fused with their hooky and polished songwriting.

The album is said to incorporate a range of sounds from 19th century choral symphonies to 20th century film soundtracks to the latest albums by Bjork, Nick Cave and theredsunband.

At the ARIA Music Awards of 2006 Lindsay Gravina and Magic Dirt were nominated for ARIA Award for Producer of the Year for their work on this album.

Release and reception
The Age said "The beautiful cover art immediately sets a contradictory tone by featuring red roses, and the songs include smatterings of country, doo-wop and girly pop alongside their more typical hard-edged sounds. It's easily their most diverse and accessible album yet."

Track listing
All songs written by Magic Dirt.

 "Feels Like a Demon" - 3:19
 "Snow White" - 3:57
 "Locket" - 3:03
 "Grab Your Hair" - 4:42
 "Envious" - 3:43
 "I Love the Rain" - 3:55
 "Dyin'" - 4:16
 "Sleep" - 4:19
 "Mother's Latest Fear" - 5:48
 "Tiger Eyes" - 4:56

Charts

Release history

References

 

2005 albums
Magic Dirt albums
East West Records albums